A powerful number is a positive integer m such that for every prime number p dividing m, p2 also divides m. Equivalently, a powerful number is the product of a square and a cube, that is, a number m of the form m = a2b3, where a and b are positive integers. Powerful numbers are also known as squareful, square-full, or 2-full. Paul Erdős and George Szekeres studied such numbers and Solomon W. Golomb named such numbers powerful.

The following is a list of all powerful numbers between 1 and 1000:
1, 4, 8, 9, 16, 25, 27, 32, 36, 49, 64, 72, 81, 100, 108, 121, 125, 128, 144, 169, 196, 200, 216, 225, 243, 256, 288, 289, 324, 343, 361, 392, 400, 432, 441, 484, 500, 512, 529, 576, 625, 648, 675, 676, 729, 784, 800, 841, 864, 900, 961, 968, 972, 1000, ... .

Equivalence of the two definitions 

If m = a2b3, then every prime in the prime factorization of a appears in the prime factorization of m with an exponent of at least two, and every prime in the prime factorization of b appears in the prime factorization of m with an exponent of at least three; therefore, m is powerful.

In the other direction, suppose that m is powerful, with prime factorization

where each αi ≥ 2.  Define γi to be three if αi is odd, and zero otherwise, and define βi = αi − γi.  Then, all values βi are nonnegative even integers, and all values γi are either zero or three, so

supplies the desired representation of m as a product of a square and a cube.

Informally, given the prime factorization of m, take b to be the product of the prime factors of m that have an odd exponent (if there are none, then take b to be 1). Because m is powerful, each prime factor with an odd exponent has an exponent that is at least 3, so m/b3 is an integer. In addition, each prime factor of m/b3 has an even exponent, so m/b3  is a perfect square, so call this a2; then m = a2b3. For example:

The representation m = a2b3 calculated in this way has the property that b is squarefree, and is uniquely defined by this property.

Mathematical properties 

The sum of the reciprocals of the powerful numbers converges.  The value of this sum may be written in several other ways, including as the infinite product

 

where p runs over all primes, ζ(s) denotes the Riemann zeta function, and ζ(3) is Apéry's constant. 
More generally, the sum of the reciprocals of the  sth powers of the powerful numbers (a Dirichlet series generating function) is equal to

whenever it converges.

Let k(x) denote the number of powerful numbers in the interval [1,x]. Then k(x) is proportional to the square root of x. More precisely,

 

(Golomb, 1970).

The two smallest consecutive powerful numbers are 8 and 9. Since Pell's equation  has infinitely many integral solutions, there are infinitely many pairs of consecutive powerful numbers (Golomb, 1970); more generally, one can find consecutive powerful numbers by solving a similar Pell equation  for any perfect cube . However, one of the two powerful numbers in a pair formed in this way must be a square.
Walker's solutions to this equation are generated, for any odd integer , by considering the number

for integers  divisible by 7 and  divisible by 3,

and

It is a conjecture of Erdős, Mollin, and Walsh that there are no three consecutive powerful numbers. If a triplet of consecutive powerful numbers exists, then its smallest term must be congruent to 7, 27, or 35 modulo 36.

Sums and differences of powerful numbers 

Any odd number is a difference of two consecutive squares: (k + 1)2 = k2 + 2k + 1, so (k + 1)2 − k2 = 2k + 1. Similarly, any multiple of four is a difference of the squares of two numbers that differ by two: (k + 2)2 − k2 = 4k + 4. However, a singly even number, that is, a number divisible by two but not by four, cannot be expressed as a difference of squares. This motivates the question of determining which singly even numbers can be expressed as differences of powerful numbers. Golomb exhibited some representations of this type:

2 = 33 − 52
10 = 133 − 37
18 = 192 − 73 = 35 − 152.

It had been conjectured that 6 cannot be so represented, and Golomb conjectured that there are infinitely many integers which cannot be represented as a difference between two powerful numbers. However, Narkiewicz showed that 6 can be so represented in infinitely many ways such as

6 = 5473 − 4632,

and McDaniel showed that every integer has infinitely many such representations (McDaniel, 1982).

Erdős conjectured that every sufficiently large integer is a sum of at most three powerful numbers; this was proved by Roger Heath-Brown (1987).

Generalization 

More generally, we can consider the integers all of whose prime factors have exponents at least k. Such an integer is called a k-powerful number, k-ful number, or k-full number.

(2k+1 − 1)k,  2k(2k+1 − 1)k,   (2k+1 − 1)k+1

are k-powerful numbers in an arithmetic progression. Moreover, if a1, a2, ..., as are k-powerful in an arithmetic progression with common difference d, then

 a1(as + d)k,  
a2(as + d)k, ..., as(as + d)k, (as + d)k+1

are s + 1 k-powerful numbers in an arithmetic progression.

We have an identity involving k-powerful numbers:

ak(al + ... + 1)k + ak + 1(al + ... + 1)k + ... + ak + l(al + ... + 1)k = ak(al + ... +1)k+1.

This gives infinitely many l+1-tuples of k-powerful numbers whose sum is also k-powerful. Nitaj shows there are infinitely many solutions of x+y=z in relatively prime 3-powerful numbers(Nitaj, 1995). Cohn constructs an infinite family of solutions of x+y=z in relatively prime non-cube 3-powerful numbers as follows: the triplet

X = 9712247684771506604963490444281, Y = 32295800804958334401937923416351, Z = 27474621855216870941749052236511

is a solution of the equation 32X3 + 49Y3 = 81Z3. We can construct another solution by setting X′ = X(49Y3 + 81Z3), Y′ = −Y(32X3 + 81Z3), Z′ = Z(32X3 − 49Y3) and omitting the common divisor.

See also 
Achilles number
Highly powerful number

Notes

References

External links 
 Power-full number at Encyclopedia of Mathematics.
 
 The abc conjecture
 

Integer sequences